Kate McShane is an American legal drama television series that aired from September 10 until November 12, 1975. Kate McShane was the first series to feature a female lawyer in the lead role. A two-hour pilot film aired April 11, 1975.

Premise
Kate McShane is an Irish American lawyer who gets help from her dad, an ex-cop, and her brother, a priest and a law professor.

Cast
Anne Meara as Kate McShane
Charles Haid as Ed McShane
Sean McClory as Pat McShane
 Benjamin Stiller, Anne Meara and Jerry Stiller's son, then almost 10, is listed on an 8/14/1975 Call Sheet in the role of Nickie in the “Little Bit of Knowledge" episode (episode 11).

Episodes

References

External links

1975 American television series debuts
1975 American television series endings
1970s American drama television series
1970s American legal television series
English-language television shows
CBS original programming
Television series by CBS Studios
Television shows set in Colorado